Pillow Talk (simplified Chinese: 再见单人床) is a Singaporean Chinese drama which will be telecast on Singapore's free-to-air channel, MediaCorp Channel 8. It stars Joanne Peh, Pierre Png, Thomas Ong, Michelle Chia and Jacelyn Tay of this series with special appearances Josephine Teo, Teo Ser Luck, Baey Yam Keng and many others.

Synopsis
How exactly are men different from women? How exactly does being in love differ from being married?

A couple tied the knot because they yearned to wed. The bride's parents divorced three days after her marriage because they had tolerated each other to breaking point after their long years of marriage.

This drama paints the married life of four wedded couples: a pair of newly-weds enjoying nuptial bliss; a couple married for seven years struggling for survival in the midst of establishing their careers and raising children, and whose marriage is showing cracks yet they are clueless about managing the strained relationship; a middle-aged couple married for decades who try but fail to change each other's ways, and who long to end their marriage to gain freedom but eventually realising that they are inseparable; an old loving couple who bicker to spice up their lives, and having understood the essence of marriage, manage their monotonous married life with wisdom.

Apart from exploring the meaning of marriage, the drama provides tips to preserve a marriage in a light-hearted manner. By educating through entertainment, viewers learn to appreciate that as "Home is not a place to reason, but to love", it is an art to maintain a relationship and that the true meaning of marriage hinges on patience, wisdom and love. How exactly are men different from women? How exactly does being in love differ from being married?

Production
Mars vs Venus's Chinese name is 幸福双人床 (literally Lucky Double Bed), whereas this drama's is 再见单人床, which translates to "Seeing the Single Bed again". 再见单人床 can also be interpreted as saying goodbye to the single bed, implying one is going to get married.

This drama was planned to have 20 episodes, but added an episode due to overruns in filming.

Cast

Special appearances

Overseas broadcast

Awards and nominations
Pillow Talk is nominated in nine categories, and won the year's Best Drama Serial.

Star Awards 2013

See also
 List of programmes broadcast by Mediacorp Channel 8
 List of Pillow Talk (TV series) episodes

References
Joanne Peh is the celeb blogger on the Pillow Talk posts.

Singapore Chinese dramas
2012 Singaporean television series debuts
Channel 8 (Singapore) original programming